Stellah Wafula (born 7 July 1998) is a Kenyan rugby sevens player. She competed in the women's tournament at the 2020 Summer Olympics.

References

External links
 

1998 births
Living people
Female rugby sevens players
Olympic rugby sevens players of Kenya
Rugby sevens players at the 2020 Summer Olympics
Place of birth missing (living people)
Kenya international women's rugby sevens players